John Conlan was an Irish politician and farmer. He was first elected to Dáil Éireann at the 1923 general election as a Farmers' Party Teachta Dála (TD) for the Kildare constituency. He lost his seat at the June 1927 general election, and was an unsuccessful candidate at the September 1927 general election.

References

Year of birth missing
Year of death missing
Farmers' Party (Ireland) TDs
Irish farmers
Members of the 4th Dáil
Politicians from County Kildare